Ostrožno pri Ponikvi is a settlement northeast of Ponikva in the Municipality of Šentjur, eastern Slovenia. The settlement, and the entire municipality, are included in the Savinja Statistical Region, which is in the Slovenian portion of the historical Duchy of Styria.

Name
Together with Ostrožno pri Ločah, this constituted a single settlement named Ostrožno until 1953. Ostrožno was split into two parts in 1953, and the part in the Municipality of Šentjur was renamed Ostrožno pri Ponikvi.

References

External links

Ostrožno pri Ponikvi at Geopedia

Populated places in the Municipality of Šentjur